The Castleford Tigers competed in their twelfth Super League in their 84th rugby league season. They also competed in the 2009 Challenge Cup.

Transfers
Transfers for 2009 (In)

Transfers for 2009 (Out)

Full squad

Fixtures and results

League table

Notes
1. Castleford win 35–34 via the golden point rule.

References

External links
 Castleford Tigers' official website

Castleford Tigers seasons
Castleford Tigers season